Onni Hynninen (27 November 1910 – 24 June 2001) was a Finnish sports shooter. He competed in the 50 m rifle event at the 1948 Summer Olympics.

References

External links
 

1910 births
2001 deaths
People from Vyborg District
People from Viipuri Province (Grand Duchy of Finland)
Finnish male sport shooters
Olympic shooters of Finland
Shooters at the 1948 Summer Olympics